James Mugford (May 19, 1749 – May 19, 1776) was a captain in the Continental Navy.

Life and naval career
Mugford commanded the schooner Franklin in the Continental Navy, serving through 1775 in John Manley's squadron off Boston. He captured British ship Hope with a large cargo of military stores and powder, and took his prize into Boston, running under the noses of the British fleet lying in the outer harbor.

Franklin was attacked during the night of May 19, 1776 in the company of Lady Washington (a small privateer schooner with a crew of 7 commanded by Joseph Cunningham) by British boarders claiming to be friends from Boston; Captain Mugford was killed in action.

The report of General Ward, the overall American commander in Boston, stated:

Captain Mugford was very fiercely attacked by twelve or thirteen boats full of men, but he and his men exerted themselves with remarkable bravery, beat off the enemy, sunk several of their boats, and killed a number of their men; it is supposed they lost sixty or seventy.  The intrepid Captain Mugford fell a little before the enemy left his schooner; he was ran through with a lance while he was cutting off the hands of the pirates as they attempted to board him, and it was said that with his own hands he cut off five pairs of theirs. ...  The Lady Washington. ... was attacked by five boats, which were supposed to contain near or quite a hundred men; but after repeated efforts to board her they were beaten off by the intrepidity and exertions of the little company, who gloriously defended the Lady against the brutal ravishers of liberty.

Mugford had captured a British ship and, having delivered her and her cargo to Boston, he enlisted the Lady Washington to ferry him back to his own ship, the Franklin. A dozen or more British boats attempted to intercept him but arrived too late. Instead they tried to board by pretending to be friendly. Mugford warned them to keep their distance and fired his cannons loaded with musket balls when they ignored him. The attackers split into two groups, with the larger attacking the Franklin and the smaller attacking the Lady Washington. According to a report in The Pennsylvania Evening Post, Mugford was killed by a musket ball rather than a lance. After being shot he said to his lieutenant, "I am a dead man, do not give up the vessel; you will be able to beat them. If not, cut the cable and run ashore." Mugford was the only American life lost in the fight and he was buried in Marblehead, Massachusetts.

Namesake
Two United States Navy ships, USS Mugford, have been named for him.

References

1749 births
1776 deaths
Continental Navy officers
United States military personnel killed in the American Revolutionary War
Deaths by firearm in international waters